Henry Alexander (1787–1861) was an English Tory politician who represented Barnstaple from 1826 to 1830.

References

1787 births
1861 deaths
Members of the Parliament of the United Kingdom for Barnstaple
UK MPs 1826–1830